Alcolea is a town near Córdoba, Spain. The town is significant for its 19-arch bridge, built between 1785 and 1792, crossing the Guadalquivir, and which was the site of two battles in the 19th century.

History 
Two battles were waged at the bridge in the 19th century:
Battle of Alcolea Bridge (1808)
Battle of Alcolea (1868)

References

Municipalities in the Province of Córdoba (Spain)